The Parish Church of Saint Mary, commonly known as il-Knisja l-Qadima (the old church) is a Roman Catholic parish church in Birkirkara, Malta, dedicated to the Assumption of Mary. It was built in the 17th century, and it has a Renaissance design attributed to the architects Vittorio Cassar and Tommaso Dingli.

The church fell out of use when St Helen's Basilica replaced it as Birkirkara's parish church in the 18th century. Its roof and dome collapsed in the 19th century, and the church remained in ruins until it was restored in the second half of the 20th century. It became a parish church once again in 2005.

History
The Parish Church of St. Mary is located outside the historic centre of Birkirkara, and it was built on a hill so as to be protected from corsair attacks. In the medieval period, a church dedicated to the Assumption of Mary and St. Helen existed on the site of the present church. A cemetery and two small chapels were found in the vicinity.

Construction of the present church began in the early 17th century, probably in 1615 or 1616. Work on the church continued throughout the century, and the interior was almost completed by 1646. The dome was finished in around 1656, while the belfry was built in around 1679.

The church fell out of use in the late 18th century, after the St Helen's Basilica was blessed in 1782. Bishop Vincenzo Labini visited the church in 1787, and he found it in a state of disrepair, with the roof in danger of collapsing. The doors and windows of the church were barred, and it was only used for funerals. Part of the roof collapsed by 1830, and the dome and the rest of the roof were destroyed in an earthquake on 24 June 1856. The belfry was in danger of collapsing by 1894.

On 3 December 1910, the first committee for the restoration of the church was established. Restoration actually began on 7 October 1969, and the roof of the nave was rebuilt by 1972. Works continued throughout the following decades until the 1990s, although restoration is still not complete. The church became a parish once again in 2005. It is now the third parish of Birkirkara, along with those of St. Helen and St. Joseph the worker

There are currently some structural problems with the church, and there are several cracks within its walls. Despite this, the risk of collapse is considered remote.

The church is scheduled as a Grade 1 national monument, and it is also listed on the National Inventory of the Cultural Property of the Maltese Islands.

Architecture

The Parish Church of St. Mary is an example of Renaissance architecture. The church is commonly attributed to the architects Vittorio Cassar and Tommaso Dingli. There is no documentary evidence of Cassar's involvement and this attribution is disputed since he was probably dead when work on the church began, but Dingli's involvement is well-established.

The church's façade has Corinthian pilasters, and the central bay has an arched main doorway flanked by columns on either side. The door is topped by five escutcheons containing coats of arms, including those of King Philip II of Spain, Grand Master Alof de Wignacourt, Bishop Baldassare Cagliares and the parish priest Don Filippo Borg. The stonework around the doorway and the coats of arms is very ornate, and it is probably influenced by the Spanish Plateresque style. Each of the two side bays contains three empty niches.

The church's interior is ornate, with sculpture forming an integral part of the building.

Further reading
Clarification in video. Designed by Cassar with Renaissance elements and completed by Dingli with Baroque elements.
 
Il-Karkariżi b'appell wara l-inċident f'Ta Ġieżu r-Rabat
Awdjo: "Sibt il-bieb fjamma" - Is-sagristan tal-knisja l-qadima ta' Birkirkara

See also

Culture of Malta
History of Malta
List of churches in Malta
Religion in Malta

References

External links

Official website

Birkirkara
Renaissance architecture in Malta
Limestone churches in Malta
17th-century Roman Catholic church buildings in Malta
National Inventory of the Cultural Property of the Maltese Islands